Elk River Coal and Lumber No. 10 is a , Mikado type steam locomotive built by American Locomotive Company in 1924 and used by its owners to haul mine waste from Rich Run Mine in Widen, West Virginia. It was retired in 1959 and moved to its present location at Huntington, West Virginia, in 1977.

It was built for the Toledo Angola and Western as their No. 100 in 1924. It was purchased sometime thereafter by Elk River Coal and Lumber Company.

It was added to the National Register of Historic Places as Elk River Coal and Lumber Company #10 Steam Locomotive in 2006.

References

National Register of Historic Places in Cabell County, West Virginia
Tourist attractions in Cabell County, West Virginia
Railway locomotives on the National Register of Historic Places
2-8-2 locomotives
ALCO locomotives
Individual locomotives of the United States
Railway locomotives introduced in 1924
Rail infrastructure on the National Register of Historic Places in West Virginia
Preserved steam locomotives of West Virginia